Ashland High School (AHS) is a public high school in Ashland, Oregon, United States, near the Southern Oregon University campus.

History

Fire 
On June 3, 2006 at 2:30 pm, a fire broke out in the AHS room behind the gym during a farewell assembly for the seniors. Students and teachers were evacuated. The gym was heavily damaged and Mountain Avenue was closed for hours. No one was hurt during the fire. The fire department determined that the fire had been started by two students with firework sparklers.

Homecoming
The homecoming dance on September 25, 2015 was the first school dance at AHS to feature gender-neutral "homecoming royalty". The change was initiated by student body presidents and approved by the principal at the time, Michelle Zundel. The change received wide publicity and was announced to the student body in a video shown to all students during the mandatory "advisory" class.

On the afternoon of October 1, 2015, during the school's homecoming celebration, Ashland Police Department officers put the school into lockdown following a potential threat of a school shooting. An AHS alumnus had posted to Facebook a photo of a gun with threatening statements against the school. The Umpqua Community College shooting had taken place about three and a half hours prior, prompting the police to take the situation especially seriously. Students were kept in classes 10 minutes past the end of the day and the homecoming parade was cancelled. The threat was later deemed too vague to represent a significant danger.

Academics
In 2008, 81% of the school's seniors received a high school diploma. Of 296 students, 239 graduated, 53 dropped out, one received a modified diploma, and three were still in high school in 2009.

The school received a silver ranking from U.S. News & World Reports 2010 "America's Best High Schools" survey.

Notable alumni
Michelle Alexander - writer, civil rights advocate
 Chad Cota - NFL safety
 Ann Curry (1974) - Emmy award-winning television journalist
 Alan DeBoer - state senator
 David Fincher - film director
 Sam Gaviglio - MLB pitcher, Kansas City Royals
 Gloria Greer - actress
 Jeremy Guthrie - MLB pitcher, Kansas City Royals
 Johnny Harris - filmmaker, journalist, and YouTuber
 Kenneth Hobson - U.S. Air Force four-star general
 Darren Kavinoky (1984) - criminal lawyer and television journalist
 Winona LaDuke - Native American politician
 Tucker Reed - Author, journalist, feminist activist and convicted killer
 Sonny Sixkiller (1969) - WFL quarterback
 Hannah Stocking (2011) - social media personality
 Tessa Violet (2008) - internet vlogger, singer, and songwriter
 Larry Wagner (1926) - composer and arranger

 Steffanie Leigh Garrard - Broadway musical star
 Shana Cooper - theatrical director
 Solomon Weisbard - international lighting designer

References

High schools in Jackson County, Oregon
Educational institutions established in 1890
Buildings and structures in Ashland, Oregon
Schools accredited by the Northwest Accreditation Commission
Public high schools in Oregon
1890 establishments in Oregon